Moti Jharna is a village in Taljhari CD block in Rajmahal subdivision of Sahibganj district in the Indian state of Jharkhand.

Geography

Location

Overview
Rajmahal coalfield is shown in the map. The entire area is overwhelmingly rural with only small pockets of urbanisation.

Note: The full screen map is interesting. All places marked on the map are linked and you can easily move on to another page of your choice. Enlarge the map to see what else is there – one gets railway links, many more road links and so on. One can opt for Vehicles such as e-rickshaw or a taxi to this place from Sahibganj District.

Demographics
According to the 2011 Census of India, Moti Jharna had a total population of 3,107, of which 1,654 (53%) were males and 1,453 (47%) were females. Population in the age range 0–6 years was 649. The total number of literate persons in Moti Jharna was 1,412 (57.45% of the population over 6 years).

Waterfall
Moti Jharna (pearl cascade) is the most picturesque waterfall in Sahebganj district, at the head of a picturesque glen of the Rajmahal hills. The water of a small hill stream tumbles over two ledges of rock, each 50 to 60 feet high.

References

Villages in Sahibganj district
Waterfalls of Jharkhand